Jason Hershey (born 1978 in Spokane, Washington), better known as O-Shen, is a reggae musician, raised in Papua New Guinea. O-Shen resides in Hawai'i but still visits Papua New Guinea. He raps and sings most of his songs in Tok Pisin.

Biography 
O-Shen although born in Spokane, Washington was raised on the island of Papua New Guinea from a very young age.

Career 
He has had collaborations with Jamaican artists like Elephant Man, Third World, Black and Uhuru. His single, Throw Away the Gun, from his album, Rascal in Paradise, was featured in the 2004 film, 50 First Dates.

Awards
Won 2001 Na Hoku Hanohano Award for Reggae Album of the Year

Discography

Studio albums

Singles

References

External links
O-Shen on MySpace Music

1978 births
Reggae musicians
Living people
Papua New Guinean singers
People from Morobe Province
Na Hoku Hanohano Award winners